The 1999 Prix de l'Arc de Triomphe was a horse race held at Longchamp on Sunday 3 October 1999. It was the 78th running of the Prix de l'Arc de Triomphe.

The winner was Montjeu, a three-year-old colt trained in France by John Hammond. The winning jockey was Michael Kinane.

Race details
 Sponsor: Groupe Lucien Barrière
 Purse: 7,000,000 F; First prize: 4,000,000 F
 Going: Heavy
 Distance: 2,400 metres
 Number of runners: 14
 Winner's time: 2m 38.5s

Full result

 Abbreviation: nk = neck

Winner's details
Further details of the winner, Montjeu.
 Sex: Colt
 Foaled: 4 April 1996
 Country: Ireland
 Sire: Sadler's Wells; Dam: Floripedes (Top Ville)
 Owner: Michael Tabor
 Breeder: Sir James Goldsmith

References

External links
 Colour Chart – Arc 1999

Prix de l'Arc de Triomphe
 1999
Prix de l'Arc de Triomphe
Prix de l'Arc de Triomphe
Prix de l'Arc de Triomphe